John Michael Kosterlitz (born June 22, 1943) is a British-American physicist. He is a professor of physics at Brown University and the son of biochemist Hans Kosterlitz. He was awarded the 2016 Nobel Prize in physics along with David Thouless and Duncan Haldane for work on condensed matter physics.

Education and early life
He was born in Aberdeen, Scotland, to German-Jewish émigrés, the son of the pioneering biochemist Hans Walter Kosterlitz and Hannah Gresshöner.  He was educated independently at Robert Gordon's College before transferring to the Edinburgh Academy to prepare for his university entrance examinations. He received his BA degree, subsequently converted to an MA degree, at Gonville and Caius College, Cambridge. In 1969, he earned a DPhil degree from the University of Oxford as a postgraduate student  of Brasenose College, Oxford.

Career and research
After a few postdoctoral positions, including positions at the University of Birmingham, collaborating with David Thouless, and at Cornell University, he was appointed to the faculty of the University of Birmingham in 1974, first as a lecturer and, later, as a reader. Since 1982, he has been professor of physics at Brown University. Kosterlitz is currently a visiting research fellow at Aalto University in Finland and since 2016 a distinguished professor at Korea Institute for Advanced Study.

Kosterlitz does research in condensed matter theory, one- and two-dimensional physics; in phase transitions: random systems, electron localization, and spin glasses; and in critical dynamics: melting and freezing.

Awards and honours
Michael Kosterlitz was awarded the  Nobel Prize in Physics in 2016, the Maxwell Medal and Prize from the British Institute of Physics in 1981, and the Lars Onsager Prize from the American Physical Society in 2000, especially, for his work on the Kosterlitz–Thouless transition. Since 1992, he has been a Fellow of the American Physical Society.

The Kosterlitz Centre at the University of Aberdeen is named in honour of his father, Hans Kosterlitz, a pioneering biochemist specializing in endorphins, who joined the faculty after fleeing Nazi persecution of Jews in 1934.

Personal life
Kosterlitz was a pioneer in Alpine climbing in the 1960s, known for working routes in the UK, Italian Alps, and Yosemite. There is 6a+ graded route bearing his name in the Orco Valley of the Italian Alps named Fessura Kosterlitz.  Kosterlitz is an American citizen and is an atheist.
He was diagnosed with multiple sclerosis in 1978.

References

External links
 

1943 births
Living people
American Nobel laureates
British Nobel laureates
Academics of the University of Birmingham
Alumni of Gonville and Caius College, Cambridge
Alumni of Brasenose College, Oxford
Jewish American atheists
American people of German-Jewish descent
American people of Scottish-Jewish descent
21st-century American physicists
British physicists
Brown University faculty
Jewish American scientists
Jewish physicists
Maxwell Medal and Prize recipients
Nobel laureates in Physics
Members of the United States National Academy of Sciences
People educated at Edinburgh Academy
People educated at Robert Gordon's College
People from Aberdeen
Scottish atheists
Scottish emigrants to the United States
Scottish Jews
Scottish people of German-Jewish descent
Scottish Nobel laureates
Fellows of the American Physical Society